In geometry, the tetrapentagonal tiling is a uniform tiling of the hyperbolic plane. It has Schläfli symbol of t1{4,5} or r{4,5}.

Symmetry
A half symmetry [1+,4,5] = [5,5] construction exists, which can be seen as two colors of pentagons. This coloring can be called a rhombipentapentagonal tiling.

Dual tiling
The dual tiling is made of rhombic faces and has a face configuration V4.5.4.5:

Related polyhedra and tiling

See also

Uniform tilings in hyperbolic plane
List of regular polytopes

References
 John H. Conway, Heidi Burgiel, Chaim Goodman-Strass, The Symmetries of Things 2008,  (Chapter 19, The Hyperbolic Archimedean Tessellations)

External links 

 Hyperbolic and Spherical Tiling Gallery
 KaleidoTile 3: Educational software to create spherical, planar and hyperbolic tilings
 Hyperbolic Planar Tessellations, Don Hatch

Hyperbolic tilings
Isogonal tilings
Isotoxal tilings
Uniform tilings